Nishant Pitti (born 1986) is the co-founder of EaseMyTrip. He also worked on the production of several Bollywood films, including Guest iin London.

Early life 
Born in 1986, Nishant Pitti has two other siblings Rikant Pitti and Prashant Pitti. His father is a commodity businessman. He did his graduation from Delhi University.

Career 
Nishant Pitti bootstrapped the travel business, EaseMyTrip, in 2008 along with his brothers. Since 2014, he has been producing Bollywood films as a branding initiative for EaseMyTrip.

Filmography

References

External links 
 
 

1986 births
Living people
Indian film producers